Shadowtime is the first opera by Brian Ferneyhough, written to an English libretto by Charles Bernstein. It was written from 1999 to 2004 and was premiered on 25 May 2004 at the Prinzregententheater in Munich. The City of Munich commissioned the composition and libretto in 1999 for the Munich Biennale. It is in seven scenes :
 New Angels/Transient Failure
 
 Doctrine of Similarity
 : A Shadow Play for Speaking Pianist
 Pools of Darkness
 Seven Tableaux Vivants Representing the Angel of History as Melancholia
 Stelae for Failed Time

The composer regards , a scene set to the composer's own text and played by a Liberace-like figure, as the centre-piece of the opera .

Synopsis
The opera begins with the suicide/death of philosopher Walter Benjamin and goes on to deal with various aspects of his writings and philosophy from the point of view of his descent into the underworld .

References

Further reading
 
 
 
 
 
 
 

Operas by Brian Ferneyhough
English-language operas
Operas based on real people
Operas set in the 20th century
Cultural depictions of German men
Cultural depictions of philosophers
2004 operas
Operas